Cylicioscapha is an extinct genus of fossil mollusk, probably a gastropod, a robust-looking euomphalid from the upper Paleozoic of North America.

Description
The shell is depressed on both the upper and lower sides; the outer rim is flattish, knobby along the upper edge; the aperture, is more or less trapezoidal.

References
J. Brooks Knight et al. 1960. Systematic Descriptions. Treatise on Invertebrate Paleontology Part I Mollusca 1. Geological Society of America and University of Kansas Press.

Euomphalidae
Pennsylvanian first appearances
Guadalupian genus extinctions
Carboniferous gastropods
Permian gastropods